Hoandedhdhoo (Dhivehi: ހޯނޑެއްދޫ) is one of the inhabited islands of Gaafu Dhaalu Atoll.

Geography

Demography

The island has a population of 1,275.

Governance
Hoandedhdhoo has an independent council which is responsible of managing the needs of the people of Hoandedhdhoo. The first elect councilors of Hoandedhdhoo council are Mohamed Ashraaf (President), Mohamed Ayaaz, Mohamed Shiraan, Hasma Hassan Manik (Vice President) and Mohamed Saeed. The second elect council (2014-2017) members are Mihamed Shiraan (President), Ahmed Mahudhee (Vice President), Hussain Fayaz, Hussain Firshan, Rifshan Ahmed Saeed.

References

Islands of the Maldives